Allerton Mauleverer with Hopperton is a civil parish in the Harrogate district of North Yorkshire, England.  According to the 2001 census it had a population of 130, increasing to 150 at the 2011 Census.

As its name suggests, the parish includes the villages of Allerton Mauleverer and Hopperton.

The parish falls under the parliamentary constituency of Selby and Ainsty, represented since 2010 by Nigel Adams of the Conservative Party.

It is in the ecclesiastical parish of Whixley with Green Hammerton, in the Diocese of Leeds.

References

Civil parishes in North Yorkshire